{{Infobox school
|name              =  Neuqua Valley High School
|image             = Neuqua Valley HS 1.jpg
|image_size        = 300px
|caption           = 
|motto             = "And As Always... Go Wildcats!"
|streetaddress     = 2360 95th Street 
|city              = Naperville
|state             = Illinois
|zipcode           = 60564
|county            = Dupage
|country           = United States
|coordinates       = 
|schooltype        = Public secondary
|opened            = 1997
|district          = Indian Prairie S.D. 204
|superintendent    = Adrian Talley 
|ceeb              = 
|principal         = Lance Fuhrer
|staff             = 222.30 (FTE)
|ratio             = 16.04
|grades            = 9–12
|gender            = Coed
|enrollment        = 3,475 (2020)
|avg_class_size    = 27.7
|slogan            = 
|fightsong         = Across the Field
|conference        = Dupage Valley Conference
|mascot            = 
 
|nickname          = Wildcats
|accreditation     = 
|ACT               = 26.1
|publication       = The Essence
|newspaper         = The EchoWildcat Weekly (program)What's Up Wildcats' (program)
|yearbook          = Neshnabec|nobel_laureates   = 
|picture           = 
|campus            = Suburban
|campus size       = 
|school_colors     =  Navy Blue Gold
|enrollment_as_of  = 
|free_label        = 
|free_label1       = 
|free_text1        = 
|free_label2       = 
|free_text2        = 
|free_label3       = 
|free_text3        = 
|free_label4       = 
|free_text4        = 
|free_label5       = 
|free_text5        = 
|homepage          = 
}}

Neuqua Valley High School (NVHS) is a public four-year high school located near the corner of Illinois Route 59 and 95th Street in Naperville, Illinois, a western suburb of Chicago, Illinois, in the United States. Neuqua Valley is the counterpart to Waubonsie Valley High School and Metea Valley High School, in Indian Prairie School District 204.  Classrooms can be rented for other district approved teachers to use after school.

History
The campus consists of two locations. The Birkett Freshman Center building houses freshmen. The Main Campus, the original building, houses sophomores, juniors, and seniors.

The original Neuqua Valley campus building was opened in August 1997, and was built to house 3000 students. The school cost $63 million to build, which at the time was the most expensive high school in Illinois, and was the largest high school built in the state in nearly eighty years. The school is named after Neaqua, a Potawatomi, and son of Waubonsie.

Starting with the 2003–2004 academic year, the nearby middle school (Crone Middle School) was converted to house the freshman class in an effort to alleviate overcrowding. From that point on, the freshmen attended class at the Freshman Center, and the Main Campus housed only the sophomore, junior, and senior classes. A third building that was completed around 2007, the Frontier Campus, allowed seniors to receive dual credit for classes from the College of DuPage. These students attended class in block sessions with no classes on Friday. It allowed for independence and freedom. Seniors from Waubonsie Valley High School also participated in the program. The Frontier Campus option was closed in 2012.

The lake behind the school is known as "Lake Birkett", in honor of the school's first principal, Kathryn Birkett, also the namesake of the Freshman Campus building, in honor of her service as district superintendent until 2014.

Neuqua Valley was designed by the architecture firm ATS&R.

In September 2017, Neuqua Valley became the first high school in District 204 to be named a National Blue Ribbon School.

Demographics
In 2020, 52.5% of the student body identifies as White, 31.1% of the student body identifies as Asian, 7.1% of the student body identifies as Hispanic, 5.3% of the student body identifies as Black, and 3.9% of the student body identifies as another race.

Academics
In 2011, Neuqua Valley had an average composite ACT score of 25.2, and graduated 99.1% of its senior class.

In 2013, US News ranked Neuqua Valley 563rd in their annual list of the top American public high schools. However, Neuqua Valley has not met federal education standards under the No Child Left Behind law.

In November 2011, Neuqua Valley High School was ranked 11th in the "Top 50 High Schools in Chicagoland" by the Chicago Tribune and was the top ranked high school in Naperville, Illinois.

The Main Campus, the original building, is divided into five wings, A-E. The A wing contains Neuqua's Fine and Applied Arts, as well as industrial and consumer education classrooms and facilities. The B wing contains History, English and Health classrooms. The C wing contains Science classrooms complete with lab equipment and also television production studios. This wing also includes the library. The D wing contains Math, Computer Science, Foreign Language, Special Education (SPED) and Business classrooms. The E wing contains the cafeteria and Physical Education facilities and the staff room. The Birkett Freshman Center (BFC) has 3 pseudo-wings G, H, and J. The G wing holds the commons, all business classes for freshman, the physical education rooms, and the engineering rooms. The H wing holds all special ed, the main office, the Class house, the staff lunch room, and the staff offices. The J wing holds all core academic classes, such as, Math, Science, English, Foreign Language, and Social Studies. It also includes all art rooms, and the library.

Honors
Neuqua Valley has received recognition by the Grammy Association for its music program. The school was named a GRAMMY signature school  in 1998, 1999, and 2001, a GRAMMY signature school Gold in 2000, 2003, 2004, and 2009, and the National GRAMMY Signature school "Best in Nation" in 2005 and 2013. The Music Department homepage has a list of other awards. Band Director Emily Binder was recognised as the best music director in the State of Illinois of 2017.

In September 2017, Neuqua was the first high school in the area to receive the National Blue Ribbon Award under President Trump. Principal Bob McBride also received an award under President Trump. This award was only given to 8 principals across the country.

Controversy
On the first day of the 2015–2016 school year, a student allegedly wore a Confederate flag, sparking a mass social media response. Yahoo! Canada published an article regarding the flag and its effect beyond Neuqua Valley High School.

Athletics
Neuqua Valley competes in the DuPage Valley Conference for athletics.  The school is also a member of the Illinois High School Association (IHSA), and competes in state tournaments that it sponsors.

The school sponsors interscholastic teams for young men and women in basketball, cross country, golf, soccer, swimming and diving, tennis, track and field, volleyball, and water polo.  Young men also have teams sponsored in baseball, football, and wrestling.  Women may compete in badminton, bowling, gymnastics, cheerleading, and softball.

While not sponsored by the IHSA, the school's athletic department also supports a competitive poms team, a dance team (orchesis), a rugby team, and a team which competes in and works with the Special Olympics. Outside of these teams, the school sponsors a lacrosse club, a sport recognized as an emerging sport by the IHSA. An extensive intramural program is available, competing in many sports including basketball, bowling, and even ping pong. Each fall, Neuqua participates in a women's powderpuff football tournament with Waubonsie, Metea, Naperville Central, Naperville North, and Benet Academy in Lisle. Neuqua is home to a large multi-team ultimate frisbee club, which started in 2007. The varsity team placed third in the nation in the 2012 season.

The following teams have placed in the top four of their respective IHSA State Championship:
 Badminton: State Champions (2014–15, 2015–16); 2nd place (2016–17)
 Baseball: 3rd place (2007–08); State Champions (2006–07); 4th place (2012–13)
 Women's basketball: 3rd place (2001–02); 2nd place (2000–01)
 Cheerleading (Large All Girls): 4th place (2011–12); 3rd place (2014–15); 2nd place (2013–14)
 Cross country (boys'):  4th place (2003–04, 2008–09); 3rd place (2010–11, 2011–12, 2018–2019);  State Champions (2007–08, 2009–10, 2016–17); 2nd place (2017–18)
 Dance team: 4th place (2012–13); State Champions (2014–15, 2015–16)
 Football (boys') : Conference Champions; Lost in State Semi-Finals (2012–13)
 Golf (girls'): 4th place (2001–02, 2002–03);  2nd place (2000–01)
 Hockey: State Champions (2002–03)
 Science Olympiad: 4th place (2016–2017) 
 Soccer (boys'):  4th place (2008–09);  2nd place (2007–08); State Champions (2003–04)
 Soccer (girls'): State Champions (2004–05); 2nd place (2014–15)
 Special Olympics (basketball): State Champions (2002–2003, 2003–2004, 2004–2005, 2008–2009, 2010–2011) 
 Speech: 2nd place (2013–14)
 Swimming and diving (boys'): 4th place (2005–06); 3rd place (2006–07); 2nd place (2008–09, 2009–10); State Champions (2007–08);
 Swimming and diving (girls'): 3rd place (2002–03, 2012–13);  2nd place (2005–06); State Champions (2018–19)
 Track and field (boys'): 2nd place (2008–09); 3rd place (2009–10); 2nd place (2014–15);State Champions (2017–18)
 Volleyball (boys'):  3rd place (2006–07, 2007–08)
 Water polo (girls'): 3rd place (2002–03)
 Flag Football (boys'): State Champion (2010–11)

The boys' cross-country team has placed within the top 15 in the state race in Peoria every year since 2001.  In 2007, the boys' cross country team won the Nike Team Nationals.  The team ran under the name "Naperville XC Club" to avoid violating IHSA season limitation by-laws. They placed 12th in 2009 and 2010, and were fifth in the nation in 2016.

Marching band
The marching band performs at all of the home football games at halftime and plays pep songs to rally the crowd during the game. The NVHS dance team dances along to the pep songs at halftime after the band's main performance. The Marching Wildcats march at the Labor Day parade and the Memorial Day parade in Downtown Naperville. The Marching Wildcats placed third at the University of Illinois Marching Band Championships two years in a row.

Pep band
The pep band performs at all of the home basketball games for both genders and Special Olympics. They play at organs and halftime and plays great and classic pep band songs. The Pep Band plays at 10 games through the season.

Facilities
The school's athletic facilities include one 8-lane, 25-yard indoor swimming pool that is 13 feet deep at the start and 9 feet deep at the turn, with a side diving well with two boards, and a small 3-lane 20-yard wading/warm-up pool. The Main Campus has three gymnasiums and a weight room. Two of these have three full-sized basketball courts each, and one is used for gymnastics. The Birkett Freshman Center has two gymnasiums, a weight room, and a rock climbing wall (given as a senior class gift in 2003). There is also a fully equipped weight room, a wrestling room, a football field enclosed by a 400-meter recycled rubber running track and a soccer stadium. The school also has more than 10 sound rooms.

Activities
The school sponsors numerous extracurricular clubs and organizations ranging from arts and academic to cultural and special interest.  While an entire list can be found at nvhs.ipsd.org, the following are the most notable in terms of being chapters of a larger national movement:
 Best Buddies
 Business Professionals of America (BPA)
 Distributive Education Clubs of America (DECA)
 Family, Career & Community Leaders of America (FCCLA)
 Individual events (speech)
 Model United Nations
 Operation Snowball
 Science Olympiad
 Team America Rocketry Challenge (TARC)
 YMCA Youth and Government
 Vocational Industrial Clubs of America/Skills USA (VICA)

Notable alumni 
 Brittany Bock – NWSL defender for Houston Dash and the United States women's national soccer team
 Roman Celentano – Major League Soccer goalkeeper for FC Cincinnati
 Bryan Ciesiulka – soccer midfielder for Saint Louis FC
 Jon Rhattigian – American football linebacker for the Seattle Seahawks
 Kevin Cordes – American record holder in the 100 and 200-yard breaststrokes and 2016 Olympic gold medalist
 Chris Derrick – distance runner
 Patrick Doody – former defender for Chicago Fire Soccer Club
 Dwayne Evans – professional basketball player for the Ryukyu Golden Kings
 Lex Fridman – Russian-American computer scientist and podcast host
 Bryan Gaul – defender for the LA Galaxy; part of the 2012 MLS Cup-winning team
 Keith Habersberger – internet personality, part of YouTube group The Try Guys; he played french horn as a member of the 2005 Grammy award-winning NVHS music program 
 Ian Krol – relief pitcher in the Cincinnati Reds organization
 Evan Lysacek – 2010 Olympic gold medalist in figure skating
 Babatunde Oshinowo – former NFL defensive tackle
 Megan Oyster – NWSL defender for Seattle Reign FC
 Danielle Panabaker – actress, Yours, Mine, and Ours, Sky High, Friday the 13th, Mr. Brooks, and The Flash'' 
 Chris Redd – actor, comedian; current Saturday Night Live cast member
 Miralem Sulejmani – soccer winger for BSC Young Boys and the Serbia national team
 Lauren Underwood – U.S. Representative for Illinois's 14th congressional district
 Lindsay Wisdom-Hylton – assistant coach for Purdue Boilermakers women's basketball; former WNBA forward

References

Public high schools in Illinois
Education in Naperville, Illinois
Schools in Will County, Illinois